Jong FC Utrecht (U23) is a Dutch football team, based in Utrecht. It is the reserve team of FC Utrecht and plays in the Eerste Divisie since the 2016–17 Eerste Divisie season.

Current squad

On loan

Staff

Current staff

Results 

Below is a table with Jong FC Utrecht's domestic results since their introduction in professional football in 2016.

Stadium 
They play their home matches at Sportcomplex Zoudenbalch. Sometimes they play at Stadion Galgenwaard. From 2016 to 2018, they played select matches at Sportpark De Westmaat.

References

External links
 Official website

 
Football clubs in the Netherlands
Football clubs in Utrecht (city)
Association football clubs established in 1970
1970 establishments in the Netherlands
Dutch reserve football teams